Events from the year 2009 in Afghanistan

Incumbents
 President: Hamid Karzai
 First Vice President: Ahmad Zia Massoud then Mohammed Fahim
 Second Vice President: Karim Khalili 
 Chief Justice: Abdul Salam Azimi

January
A supply route through Pakistan, by way of Chaman, was briefly shut down in early 2009. On January 10, tribesmen used vehicles to block the road to protest a raid by Pakistani counter-narcotics forces that left one villager dead. The protesters withdrew on January 14 after police promised to take their complaints to provincial authorities.
 United Nations Office for the Coordination of Humanitarian Affairs re-establishes its presence in Afghanistan, allowing for increased humanitarian assistance in subsequent years.

February
February 6–7, 2009, British and Afghan forces carried out Operation Diesel near Sangin, Helmand Province.

March
March 30, 2009: Operation Arctic Torch II.PRT, 1st Infantry division battles with 300 Afghan fighters in Doab, Nuristan Province. Two Americans WIA. Close air support allegedly kills100 AAF fighters.
May 4, 2009: The Granai airstrike kills 86-145 people, mostly children when American aircraft bombed a village in Farah Province.

April

May

June

July

August
On August 5/6, Rangers from Alpha Company, 3rd Battalion, 75th Ranger Regiment carried out a raid an enemy combatant's headquarters camp in the mountains of northwestern Khost Province, while moving to the objective, 7 to 9 man enemy element initiated a complex, near ambush on the Rangers, the rangers fought back with heavy weapons and close air support. The firefight resulted in the rangers killing 20 enemy fighters, destroying 2 enemy anti-aircraft guns and several other weapons, explosives and military supplies on the objective, resulting in the disruption of a major enemy headquarters and encampment; one ranger received the Silver star.

September
In September, the International Council on Security and Development released a map showing that the Taliban had a "permanent presence" in 80% of the country, with "permanent presence" defined by provinces that average one (or more) insurgent attack (lethal and non-lethal) per week.
From September 3-4th, 2009, a battle between Spanish and Italian forces of NATO's Afghan branch, against Taliban forces and militant Tajik tribals erupted. 1 Spanish soldier and 3 insurgents were injured, and 13 insurgents were killed.
On September 4, 2009, the Kunduz airstrike killed up to 179. American F-15E fighter jet struck two fuel tankers captured by Taliban insurgents; however, a large number of civilians were also killed in the attack.
 On September 9, 2009, a Special Boat Service and Afghan forces unit, supported by the SFSG, conducted a mission to rescue Stephen Farrell; a journalist captured in Kunduz province by Taliban insurgents. The mission was successful, Farrell was rescued and a number of Taliban were killed however one member of the SFSG was killed as well as Farrell's Afghan interpreter and two civilians were killed in the crossfire.

October
In October 2009, there were 72 American deaths, 8 on October 28 alone. There have been 255 American deaths in 2009, a 43% increase of last year.

November
On November 6, 2009, Ambassador Eikenberry wrote to Secretary of State Hillary Clinton, "Sending additional forces will delay the day when Afghans will take over, and make it difficult, if not impossible, to bring our people home on a reasonable timetable.  An increased U.S. and foreign role in security and governance will increase Afghan dependence, at least in the short-term."

December
December 7 - Afghan President Karzai said it may be five years before his army is ready to take on the insurgents. Karzai also said that Afghanistan's security forces will need U.S. support for another 15 to 20 years.
The New York Times published parts of the evaluation "A Different Kind of War" as a preview on the U.S. Army's official history of the war in Afghanistan in the period October 2001 - September 2005, due to be published by spring 2010. According to this study major planning to create long-term political, social and economic stability in Afghanistan was lacking.
The Taliban offered to give the U.S. "legal guarantees" that they will not allow Afghanistan to be used for attacks on other countries. There was no formal American response.
In mid-December the British Army and Afghan workers begin construction of the Route Trident road in Helmand Province.
On December 16–18, 2009, Coalition troops conducted Operation Septentrion, a 36-hour operation in the Uzbin Valley (east of Kabul). The force of 1100 troops included 800 members of the French Foreign Legion together with 200 US special forces and Afghan soldiers; during more than 90 minutes of combat several Americans were wounded, three of them seriously. Insurgents attacked with rocket-propelled grenades, mortars, and heavy machine gun fire; for the coalition forces, the French troops used shells, backed up by French Tigre and US Apache helicopters and jets. At least one Taliban fighter was killed and three injured. The purpose of Operation Septentrion was "reaffirming the sovereignty of Afghan security forces in the north of the Uzbeen Valley," according to a French military spokesperson, and also to plant an Afghan flag in a key strategic village. (While 75% of the Uzbin Valley had been under coalition control, a corner of it had remained in Taliban hands.) The operation was led by Lieutenant-Colonel Herve Wallerand. Sixteen months previously, the Uzbin Valley ambush by the Taliban in the area of Sarobi had killed 10 French soldiers and wounded 21.
On December 27, 2009, the Narang night raid killed 10 Afghan civilians mostly school children when at around 2:30 mid night US Special Forces raided Ghazi Khan Ghondi village of Narang District in Kunar province.

Deaths
In overall 2009, 520 NATO soldiers killed. 317 US soldiers, 108 UK soldiers and 95 Other NATO soldiers killed in 2009.

See also
2008 in Afghanistan
other events of 2009
2010 in Afghanistan
Timeline of the War in Afghanistan (2001-present)
Coalition combat operations in Afghanistan in 2009

References

External links
Human Rights First; Undue Process: An Examination of Detention and Trials of Bagram Detainees in Afghanistan in April 2009 (2009)

 
Timelines of the War in Afghanistan (2001–2021)
Years of the 21st century in Afghanistan
Afghanistan
Afghanistan
2000s in Afghanistan